The 2018–19 Missouri State Lady Bears basketball team represented Missouri State University during the 2018–19 NCAA Division I women's basketball season. The Lady Bears, led by sixth year head coach Kellie Harper, played their home games at JQH Arena and were members of the Missouri Valley Conference. They finished the season 25–10, 16–2 in MVC play to finish in second place. They won the Missouri Valley women's tournament to earn an automatic trip to the NCAA Women's Basketball where upset DePaul and Iowa State in the first and second rounds to advance to the sweet sixteen for the first time 2001 where they lost to Stanford.

On April 8, Harper left after 6 seasons to accept the head coaching job at her alma mater, Tennessee. She finish with a 6 year record of 118–79.

Roster

Schedule

|-
!colspan=9 style=| Exhibition

|-
!colspan=9 style=| Non-conference regular season

|-
!colspan=9 style=| Missouri Valley regular season

|-
!colspan=9 style=| Missouri Valley Women's Tournament

|-
!colspan=9 style=| NCAA Women's Tournament

Rankings
2018–19 NCAA Division I women's basketball rankings

See also
 2018–19 Missouri State Bears basketball team

References

Missouri State Lady Bears basketball seasons
Missouri State
Missouri State, basketball women
Missouri State, basketball women
Missouri State